"Forget About Tomorrow" is the third single to be taken from Welsh rock band Feeder's fourth studio album, Comfort in Sound (2002). The single charted at number 12 on the UK Singles Chart. It became the second-biggest hit off the album, after "Just the Way I'm Feeling".

Track listings
UK CD1
 "Forget About Tomorrow" – 3:50
 "Lose the Fear" – 3:12
 "Tinseltown" (acoustic) – 4:11
 "Forget About Tomorrow" (video/enhanced section)

UK CD2
 "Forget About Tomorrow" – 3:50
 "Bring It Together" – 2:42
 "Helium" (acoustic) – 2:56
 "Forget About Tomorrow" (alternative video)

UK DVD single
 A Cast of Thousands (live at Brixton Academy documentary)
 "Forget About Tomorrow" (lyric screen) – 3:50
 "Godzilla Goes to Mars" (Feeder fan gallery) – 2:10
 "Cement" (video clip) – 0:30
 "Crash" (video clip) – 0:30
 "Can't Stand Losing You" (live at Reading 2001 video clip) – 0:30
 "Piece by Piece" (European version video clip) – 0:30

Australian CD single
 "Forget About Tomorrow" – 3:50
 "Lose the Fear" – 3:12
 "Tinseltown" (acoustic) – 4:11
 "Bring It Together" – 2:42
 "Helium" (acoustic) – 2:56

Charts

References

2002 songs
2003 singles
The Echo Label singles
Feeder songs
Song recordings produced by Gil Norton
Songs written by Grant Nicholas